Borghetto di Vara (locally ) is a comune (municipality) in the Province of La Spezia in the Italian region Liguria, located about  southeast of Genoa and about  northwest of La Spezia.

Borghetto di Vara borders the following municipalities: Beverino, Brugnato, Carrodano, Levanto, Pignone, Rocchetta di Vara, Sesta Godano.

Twin towns — sister cities
Borghetto di Vara is twinned with:

  Schneckenlohe, Germany (1993)

References

Cities and towns in Liguria